Hugo Erfurth with Dog is a tempera and oil on panel painting executed by German painter Otto Dix in 1926. It depicts his personal friend, the photographer Hugo Erfurth, who also would take several pictures of the artist. The portrait is part of the collection of the Thyssen-Bornemisza Museum, in Madrid.

Description and analysis
This painting shows the influence of the German Renaissance masters, like Lucas Cranach the Elder and Hans Baldung Grien, as Dix had adopted the painstaking technique of tempera and oil on panel, rather than in canvas. He had a particular interest by portraiture, since it had a major tradition in German painting.

The current portrait was made after Dix's return from Berlin to Dresden, where he was nominated teacher at the Staatliche Akademie der Bildenden Künste, in 1926. He had already executed a portrait of Hugo Erfurth the previous year. This time Dix choose to present his friend in a depiction heavily influenced by the German tradition, but still with a very contemporary touch. Erfurth is presented at half length, dressed in the fashionable clothing he preferred, seen in profile, looking to his left, and with his large German Shepherd dog, Ajax, in front of him. The dog appears also in profile, looking to his front, with pointed ears, and his mouth open with a large protruding tongue. Behind them, there is a heavy brown curtain and a vivid blue background to their left.

The portrait represents a more realistic style than other depictions by Dix of figures from the Weimar Republic era, like the Portrait of the Journalist Sylvia von Harden, from the same year.

References

1926 paintings
Paintings by Otto Dix
Paintings in the Thyssen-Bornemisza Museum
Portraits of men